Tip Toe Falls (also known informally as Tiptoe Falls), is a  tall waterfall (though commonly mismeasured from ) on  Fall Creek in the Portola Redwoods State Park, California. There is also an  upper falls, a few hundred feet upstream, which is much lesser known.

The falls, fed by Fall Creek (a tributary of Pescadero Creek) starts by cascading down a mossy, 8 foot (2.4m) upper tier into a small pool. The creek continues downstream between grassy banks, and before long, falls over the more well known, 6 foot (1.8 m) lower tier. The lower tier empties into a round pool approximately 6” deep, before the creek cascades over sticks and rocks and continues its way downstream.

Description
Tip Toe Falls is located in a redwood forest, on a short and steep tributary of Pescadero Creek. Its two tiers tumble over 8 and 6 feet (2.4 and 1.8 m) into shallow pools. The upper tier cascades out of dense undergrowth and forest, down a mossy cliff wall into a small and shallow pool. Near the bottom, the upper falls splits into two around a fallen log. Between the upper falls and the main falls, the creek winds through a small, fern-bounded meadow at the bottom of a steep ravine with mossy rock walls that rise over 50 feet (15m) above the canyon floor. The creek then drops over the main falls, which pours out of a small gully that resembles a hanging valley, while a small trickle of water splits off towards the right bank and drops along with the main cascade into a round, rock-bound clear pool. The creek exits the pool in a small congregation of rocks.

Access
Tip Toe Falls is accessed by the  Iverson Trail, which begins at the park visitor center. Iverson Trail begins on the north side of the Nature Center. The Sequoia Nature Trail begins on the south side of the Nature Center and eventually meets the Iverson Trail. The trail eventually comes to the mouth of Fall Creek, and a narrow side trail winds upstream. The side trail soon comes to the end of the canyon, where two rock walls slope down in a “V” shape and form the low cliff that Tip Toe Falls pours over.

To access the upper falls, one must scramble up the right side of Tip Toe Falls. (The left side is more wet and mossy, and is thus more dangerous to climb.) After walking upstream along the bed of  Fall Creek, the upper falls is found on the left of the canyon, obscured by several fallen trees. If trying to get there, one must be careful as mosquitos are commonly found there, especially around the month of April.

References

External links

Virtual Reality Panorama of Tip Toe Falls

Waterfalls of California
Landforms of San Mateo County, California
State parks of California
Cascade waterfalls